Treadwell & Martin were a firm of architects in London from 1890 to 1910. The partners were Leonard Martin (born 1869) and Henry John Treadwell (1861–1910).

The firm was responsible for the design of Scott's restaurant in Coventry Street (1892–94), The Old Shades, a Grade II listed public house at 37–39 Whitehall, 80 Fetter Lane, built for Buchanan's Distillery, and the Rising Sun pub on Tottenham Court Road.

Treadwell & Martin's design for the Glasgow Art Gallery and Museum was shortlisted but unsuccessful.

References

External links
http://www.victorianweb.org/sculpture/daymond/1.html
https://web.archive.org/web/20150515201812/http://doverhouse.co.uk/heritage
http://ornamentalpassions.blogspot.co.uk/2010/01/80-fetter-lane-ec4.html
http://www.taylor-walker.co.uk/pub/rising-sun-bloomsbury/c6749/
http://www.geograph.org.uk/tagged/architect:Treadwell+%26+Martin
http://www.courtauldprints.com/image/186574/treadwell-martin-7-dering-street
https://thearchitecturalforum.wordpress.com/2014/04/29/antique-portland-stone-cartouches-from-st-jamess-market-london/

Architecture firms of England
Defunct companies based in London
1910 disestablishments in England
1890 establishments in England
British companies disestablished in 1910
British companies established in 1890